North Dade Jr./Sr. High School was a high school in Bunche Park, Florida that was part of the Miami-Dade County Public Schools District.

History
This institution opened in Bunche Park, Florida, serving the black students in the upper Dade County area from 1957 to 1966.

Charles Wyche served as the school's only principal.

Most teachers who taught at North Dade had graduated from Booker T. Washington High.

The school's property consists of seventeen acres with the baseball field on the far east side of the campus and the football field on the far west side. A canal ran behind the campus.

In 1957, the school only served seventh through tenth grades. An eleventh and then twelfth grade class were later added.

The first graduating class of 1960 chose the mascot (Thunderbird) and school colors (royal blue and white). There was a dispute between the men and women for the school colors, so the administration took on royal blue from the men's side and white from the women's side.

Prior to this school opening, students who lived in Bunche Park had to travel by bus or car to D. A. Dorsey Sr. High or Northwestern Comprehensive Senior High School.

This school only graduated seven classes, from 1960 to 1966.

After integration, students later went on to the white schools to complete high school; these schools are Carol City, Central and North Miami Senior High Schools.

See also 
 Miami-Dade County Public Schools

References

High schools in Miami-Dade County, Florida
Public middle schools in Florida
Miami-Dade County Public Schools
Public high schools in Florida
Educational institutions established in 1957
1957 establishments in Florida
Educational institutions disestablished in 1966
1966 disestablishments in Florida